Juan Marchand (born 6 April 1949) is a Puerto Rican sports shooter. He competed in the men's 25 metre rapid fire pistol event at the 1976 Summer Olympics.

References

1949 births
Living people
Puerto Rican male sport shooters
Olympic shooters of Puerto Rico
Shooters at the 1976 Summer Olympics
Place of birth missing (living people)